Rick Worley is an American cartoonist, known primarily for his comic strip A Waste of Time. He is openly gay and lives in San Francisco.

Career 
Worley began the strip A Waste of Time in 2008. A collection of the strips was published by Northwest Press in 2011, followed by a series of new material beginning in 2014. The strip is about an anthropomorphic rabbit named Rick (a stand-in for the creator) and his friends and associates, which include Truckstop (a sexually adventurous fox), Prester (an alcoholic teddy bear), Rickets (an amnesiac robot), and Capitalist Pig (a piggy bank). The series also depicts realistic human characters, including Rick's boyfriends, and fictionalized versions of cartoonists Bill Watterson and Jim Davis.

In February 2013, Worley co-curated with Justin Hall the San Francisco art exhibit "Batman on Robin", featuring works exploring the theme of homoeroticism between Batman and Robin. His work has been featured in No Straight Lines: Four Decades of Queer Comics, published by Fantagraphics in 2012; editor Robert Kirby's hardcover anthology QU33R in 2014; and in What’s Your Sign, Girl? an astrological anthology edited by Kirby 2016.

References 

Living people
American cartoonists
American LGBT artists
LGBT comics creators
Year of birth missing (living people)